Liga de Balompié Mexicano is one of the professional football leagues in Mexico. It is the first division of the league system of the National Association of Mexican Football (ANBM in Spanish). 

The league is an alternate to Liga MX, which is organized by the Mexican Football Federation (the only entity representing Mexico before FIFA), thus not recognized by FIFA. On 8 July 2020 the Liga de Balompié Mexicano became the first league sanctioned by CONIFA.

History 
The Liga de Balompié Mexicano (Mexican Football League) was presented on 29 January 2020 with the aim of providing another development opportunity to football players who did not get a place in one of the teams in the main Mexican football leagues, in addition to bringing professional football to locations that have not had sufficient presence of sports institutions or do not have adequate facilities to participate in Liga MX or Ascenso MX.

On 22 February 2020 the first league team assembly was held. On 8 July 2020 it was announced that the LBM would be the first league sanctioned by CONIFA.

On 14 October 2020, the first official game of the LBM was played, in the match, San José F.C. defeated Morelos F.C. by score of 1–0. Omar Rosas scored the first goal in the history of the competition.

Competition format 
The league's teams will play one single table tournament per season. The top finisher of the league table will advance directly to the championship final, known as the Super Final at the end of the regular cycle. The clubs classified in the second, third, fourth and fifth positions will qualify to a final phase to determine the second championship finalist. Tiebreaker criteria in the semifinal stage are in the following order: Global score, away goals and general table. A tie score after regulation time in the championship final will be resolved by penalty shoot-out.

Unike most football tournaments, two points are awarded for victory, zero for a draw. Teams have the right to enroll five foreign players, however, only three can participate on the field of play.

Teams must meet infrastructure obligations in order to participate in the League, including stadiums with a minimum capacity of 5,000 spectators, along with keeping their facilities in good conditions.

Teams 
{{Location map+ |Mexico |width=500|float=right |caption=Liga de Balompié Mexicano Official Teams |places=

Champions

References

External links 
 Official website

Association football leagues in Mexico
Sports leagues established in 2020
2020 establishments in Mexico
Liga de Balompié Mexicano
Professional sports leagues in Mexico